Daani is a Pakistani film by Khalid Ahmed and Farooq Rind. It won the best telefilm award at the Kara Film Festival in 2006.

References

Pakistani television films
2006 films
2000s Urdu-language films
Urdu-language Pakistani films